Penicillium restrictum is a species of fungus in the genus Penicillium which was isolated from the stems of the plant Silybum marianum. Penicillium restrictum produces calbistrin A

References

Further reading 
 
 
 
 
 
 
 

restrictum
Fungi described in 1927